Clyde 1 is an Independent Local Radio station based in Glasgow, Scotland, owned and operated by Bauer as part of the Hits Radio network. It broadcasts to Glasgow and West Central Scotland. 

As of December 2022, the station has a weekly audience of 664,000 listeners according to RAJAR.

History 

Clyde 1 was born out of the compulsory transmission splitting enforced by the UK regulators in the 1990s, developing the FM frequency into Radio Clyde into a Top-40 format radio station.

The development of live-streaming and digital radio led to a widening of the station's potential audience through carriage on the station's website and Bauer Radio's DAB multiplex in Glasgow.

The station's Freeview carriage came as a consequence of the closure of stable-mate 3C by the station's then-owners, and resulted in UK-wide coverage until it was removed on 30 October 2008.

On 31 December 2013, Radio Clyde celebrated its 40th anniversary.

Events
Clyde 1 used to hold an event called Clyde 1 Live at the SECC in Glasgow.
The event included some of the many artists which are broadcast on the station, past events have featured Calvin Harris, Labrinth, Jessie J, Olly Murs, The Sugababes, Amelia Lily, Pixie Lott, Mcfly, Lawson, Cover Drive, Matt Cardle, Gary Barlow, John Newman, The Vamps and also Dappy.

Programming
The majority of programming - local and networked - is produced and broadcast from Radio Clyde's studios in Clydebank, however some networked output originates from Forth 1 in Edinburgh, Tay FM in Dundee and sister station Hits Radio in Manchester. The station also opts out of some networked output to broadcast additional local programming, including sports coverage and specialist music shows.

The station's local presenters include George Bowie (Bowie at Breakfast / The GB Xperience), Garry Spence, Steven Mill and Cassi Gillespie (Bowie at Breakfast and Sunday afternoons).

News and sport
Clyde 1 broadcasts local news bulletins hourly from 6am to 7pm on weekdays and from 7am to 1pm at weekends. Headlines are broadcast on the half hour during weekday breakfast and drivetime shows, alongside sport and traffic bulletins.

The Clydebank newsroom also produces bespoke national Scottish bulletins at weekends with Sky News Radio bulletins carried overnight. Radio Clyde's head of news and sport is Lorraine Herbison, who is also Bauer's head of news for its Scottish stations.

Sports coverage airs under the Superscoreboard banner and includes live match reports during the season and a magazine show on weekday evenings. It is presented by Gordon Duncan and features regular panellists Hugh Keevins and Gordon Dalziel.

See also
 Radio Clyde
 Clyde 2

References

External links
 Clyde 1

Bauer Radio
Hits Radio
Radio stations in Glasgow
1973 establishments in the United Kingdom
Radio stations established in 1973